Brian's Hunt is a 2003 young adult novel by Gary Paulsen.  It is the fifth and final book in the award-winning Hatchet series, which deals with Brian Robeson, a boy who learns wilderness survival when he is stranded after a plane wreck.

Plot summary
Brian, who is now sixteen years old, is canoeing through the Canadian wilderness. He realizes that the woods are now his home and he will never be happy in modern society with its noise, pollution, and inauthentic people. He now spends his time in the wild, hunting, fishing, and home schooling himself. While Brian does not miss human contact, he finds his thoughts frequently turning to Kay-gwa-daush (also known as Susan), the eldest daughter of the Cree family who rescued him at the end of Brian's Winter. Though he has only seen her photograph, her family has described her as an adventurous, self-reliant young woman, and Brian wonders if she might be a kindred spirit.

While canoeing, Brian finds a seriously wounded Malamute dog, which he nurses back to health. The dog is clearly domesticated, and Brian begins to worry that whatever maimed the dog may have done the same to her owners. He remembers his Cree friends, the Smallhorns, and decides to go check on them.

When Brian reaches their cabin, he finds that a bear had killed the parents and apparently chased Susan into hiding. Brian returns her to her home and buries the family while she radios for help.  The authorities arrive to take Susan to relatives in Winnipeg. Brian, along with the dog, stays behind in order to hunt down and kill the bear, knowing very well that the hunt could cost him his life.

Brian uses skills he has learned (explained in past books Hatchet, Brian's Return, and Brian's Winter) to search for the bear that killed his friends. He finds bear tracks on an island and begins to follow them. He later realizes that he was walking in a circle. Soon, the hunter becomes the hunted. The bear is actually following Brian. The next day, instead of moving on, he waits for the bear. After a hard-fought battle with the bear, Brian is triumphant.

References

External links
 Author's website.

2003 American novels
American young adult novels
Novels by Gary Paulsen
Novels about survival skills
Novels set in Canada